The Gypsy Baron is a 1935 German operetta film directed by Karl Hartl and starring Anton Walbrook, Hansi Knoteck and Fritz Kampers. It is an adaptation of the 1885 operetta The Gypsy Baron. It was made at the Babelsberg Studios of UFA in Berlin. The film's sets were designed by the art director Werner Schlichting. It was shot on location in Brandenburg and the Kingdom of Yugoslavia.A  separate French-language version,Le baron tzigane was also produced.

Main cast
 Anton Walbrook as Sandor Barinkay
 Hansi Knoteck as Saffi
 Fritz Kampers as Koloman Zsupan
 Gina Falckenberg as Arsena Zsupan, seine Tochter
 Edwin Jürgensen as Homonay
 Rudolf Platte as Ernö
 Josef Sieber as Pali
 Margarete Kupfer as Czipra
  as Junge

References

Bibliography

External links 
 

1935 films
Operetta films
1935 musical comedy films
German musical comedy films
Films of Nazi Germany
1930s German-language films
Films directed by Karl Hartl
UFA GmbH films
1930s historical comedy films
German historical comedy films
Films based on operettas
Films set in Hungary
Films set in Romania
German multilingual films
Films about Romani people
German black-and-white films
1935 multilingual films
1930s historical musical films
German historical musical films
1930s German films
Films shot at Babelsberg Studios